Barangay Poblacion Kadingilan is a primarily agricultural barangay of the Philippine municipality of Kadingilan in the province of Bukidnon on the island of Mindanao.

Physical
Poblacion Kadingilan is located 7°20'31" north and from 124°49' to 125°2' east along the southwestern border of the province of Bukidnon. It is bounded on the north by the barangay Bocboc of Don Carlos; northeast by the barangay Salvacion; east by the barangay Malinao and on the south and southwest by the barangay Pay-as and northwest by the barangay Baroy. Kadingilan is composed of 6 puroks including the 5A and 6A with aggregate area of 773.910 hectares. The landmark of the area is in sitio Kibatogon on the boundary of barangay Bocboc.

The climate belongs to type C agro-climate Zone. This zone is the most extensive and covers most of the present and potential agricultural area in the province. The rainfall is relatively low due to the rain shadow effect of the mountainous belt on the eastern side of Bukidnon. The heaviest rainfall occurs during May to September.

The soil type is predominantly Kidapawan Clay.

Community
According to the 2000 census, the population was 4,629. With a population density of 499 per square kilometer, Poblacion Kadingilan is the most densely populated barangay in the municipality of Kadingilan. It has a day care center, three primary schools and one secondary school; Baptist, Seventh Adventist, Philippine Independent Church (Aglipay Church), Roman Catholic and Iglesia ni Kristo (Church of Christ) affiliations. There is a Municipal Health Office, Rural Health Center, MSW-Development and Department of Health offices. Also the Salvacion Multipurpose Cooperative and SMC bank.

Poblacion Kadingilan now has infrastructure, transportation, a water supply, power supply from FIBECO, communication facilities, an annual town fiesta and annual town foundation day, sports and recreational facilities, development establishments, tourist spots, and common service establishment's institutions.

Government
The barangay Poblacion Kadingilan is the economic capital for the municipality of Kadingilan. The Mayor's office, municipal hall, municipal facilities and services are in Poblacion. Barangay hall is located at the back of Municipal Hall. The Honorable Modesto Lebria together with the 8 councillors and the SK chairman Hon. Mary Ann Pascua form the local government.

Problems
There are fewer malnourished children here compared to other barangays, but health service problems include the lack of a local hospital; inadequate medical instrument supplies, materials and medicines; the lack of permanent rural health midwives and dentists; and no regular garbage disposal.

The economic stability of Kadingilan relies mainly on agriculture, but shortage of corn occurs especially during drought or dry seasons, largely due to limited post-harvest facilities, particularly warehouses for the farmers to store their harvested crops. Also most farmers do not have a vehicle to deliver their sugarcane into a distant miller.

Kadingilan is the only municipality that still has no properly surfaced roads. The water supply is insufficient for the needs of the residents.

Gallery

See also
 The original essay on which this article was based.

Barangays of Bukidnon
Poblacion